Operation Carthage was an Allied air raid against German-occupied Copenhagen on 21 March 1945 during World War II. It was carried out by the Royal Air Force (RAF), Royal Australian Air Force (RAAF) and Royal New Zealand Air Force (RNZAF).

Long requested by the Danish resistance, the raid went awry when an RAF plane struck a mast and crashed at the Institut Jeanne d'Arc, which led other Allied aircraft to bomb the school, mistaking it for their actual target; this led to 104 civilians at the school being killed. Other Allied planes managed to target the Shellhus, destroying the building and allowing for 18 detainees to escape. The raid ultimately led to the death of 9 Allied pilots, 55 German soldiers, 47 Gestapo employees, 8 Danish detainees and 125 civilians.

Background

The raid was requested by members of the Danish resistance movement to free imprisoned members and to destroy the records of the Gestapo, to disrupt their operations. The RAF initially turned down the request as too risky, due to the location in a crowded city centre and the need for low-level bombing, but they approved the raid in early 1945 after repeated requests. Once approval had been given, planning for the raid took several weeks; scale models of the target building and the surrounding city were built for use by pilots and navigators in preparation for a very low-level attack.

Raid

The attacking force consisted of Royal Air Force De Havilland Mosquito F.B.VI fighter-bombers of No. 2 Group RAF from No. 140 Wing RAF, comprising No. 21 Squadron RAF, No. 464 Squadron RAAF, and No. 487 Squadron RNZAF. The aircraft flew in three waves of six aircraft, with two reconnaissance Mosquito B.IVs from the Royal Air Force Film Production Unit to record the results of the attack, taking a short film. Thirty RAF Mustang fighters gave air cover from German aircraft and attacked anti-aircraft guns during the raid.

The force left RAF Fersfield in the morning and reached Copenhagen after 11:00. The raid was carried out at rooftop level. Several bombers in the second and third wave accidentally hit the school, mistaking the burning structure as having been successfully bombed by the first wave.

In 2022, Netflix released a feature film about the events, The Bombardment.

Aftermath

On the following day, a reconnaissance aircraft surveyed the target to assess the results. The damage was severe, with the west wing of the six-storey building reduced nearly to ground level. The Danish underground supplied a photograph showing the building burning from end to end. The raid had destroyed the Gestapo headquarters and records, severely disrupting Gestapo operations in Denmark, as well as allowing the escape of 18 prisoners. Fifty-five German soldiers, 47 Danish employees of the Gestapo and eight prisoners died in the headquarters building. Four Mosquito bombers and two Mustang fighters were lost and nine Allied airmen were killed. At the Jeanne d'Arc School, 86 schoolchildren and 18 adults were killed, many of them nuns.

On 14 July 1945, remains of an unidentified male casualty were recovered from the ruins of the Shellhus and transferred to the Department of Forensic Medicine of the University of Copenhagen. This happened again four days later and the two casualties were buried in Bispebjerg Cemetery on 4 and 21 September, respectively.

In popular culture
The Danish movie The Shadow in My Eye (Skyggen i mit øje in Danish), telling the story of the raid, was released in October 2021 in Denmark. Netflix released the movie on its streaming service in March 2022, as The Bombardment.

Gallery

See also
 Aarhus Air Raid, a similar attack on Gestapo headquarters in Aarhus, Denmark
 Operation Jericho, a similar attack on Amiens Prison in France
 Oslo Mosquito raid, a similar attack on Gestapo headquarters in Norway, with 80 off-target civilian casualties

References
Notes

Bibliography

External links
 (DK in English) On the entire event 
 (DK in Danish, encyclopaedic) On the French School (encyclopedic) 
 (DK in Danish, encyclopedic) On the Shell office building (encyclopedic) 
 (DK in Danish) On the bombing of the French School 

 
 IWM Interview with RAF officer Edward Sismore, who participated in the raid
 

Carthage
Conflicts in 1945
History of the Royal Air Force during World War II
1945 in Denmark
History of Copenhagen
De Havilland Mosquito
March 1945 events
1940s in Copenhagen